Doran Clark (born August 8, 1954) is an American actress.

Early life and education
Clark was born to actress/model Audrey Caire and William Clark. She has two sisters and two brothers, including actress Louise Clark Goddard (of the Harry and Louise political commercials). She is the granddaughter of General Mark W. Clark. Clark graduated from Syracuse University with a degree in European history and later earned a Bachelor of Arts degree in performing arts from Briarcliff College.

Career
Clark's film and television credits include Black Eagle (with Jean-Claude Van Damme), Passport to Paris (with Mary-Kate and Ashley Olsen), numerous appearances on Perry Mason, Matlock, Jake and the Fatman, Trapper John, M.D., an appearance on an episode of MacGyver called "The Heist," several episodes of Murder, She Wrote, as well as many starring and supporting roles on sitcoms from the late 1970s through the 1990s.

She was known for her roles on three different soaps: the short-lived (eight episodes) Secrets of Midland Heights as Ann Dulles; King's Crossing as Jillian Beauchamp; and Emerald Point N.A.S. as Ensign Leslie Mallory. She also played Charlene Chasen in the short-lived NBC-TV drama Nightingales.

Personal life
, Clark resided in Hollywood Hills, California. She is married to producer Peter Abrams and they have two children.

Filmography

Film

Television

References

External links
 

1954 births
American film actresses
American television actresses
Living people
21st-century American women